Pingchang County is a county in the northeast of Sichuan province. It is under the administration of the prefecture-level city of Bazhong.

Administration
Pingchang has 16 towns and 11 villages.

Towns: Jiangkou, Xiangtan, Sima, Desheng, Baiyi, Yuanshan, Yuejia, Yuntai, Lancao, Xixing, Zhenlong, Bishan, Qiujia, Hanshui, Tanxi, Folou.

Villages: Dazhai, Liumen, Longgang, Yuanshi, Qingyun, Tuxing, Banmiao, Nilong, Yankou, Xishen, Wangjing.

Climate

Transportation 
Pingchang railway station on the Bazhong–Dazhou railway is situated here.

See also 

 Baiyi Ancient Town
 Balling Terrace
 Buddha Head Mountain
 Sima Water Town

References

External links
 Prefectural page on Pingchang county 

 
County-level divisions of Sichuan
Bazhong